Lead Hill School District is a public school district in Boone County, Arkansas, United States which serves the cities of Diamond City, Lead Hill and South Lead Hill along with surrounding unincorporated areas within Boone County.

History

Due to the district's small size, it was in danger of being forcibly consolidated into another district, as consolidation is normally mandated for districts with enrollments each below 350 for two consecutive school years. The district had 338 students and 344 students in the 2016-2017 and 2017-2018 school years. In 2019 the Arkansas Department of Education granted the district a waiver that allowed it to remain independent.

Schools 
 Lead Hill High School 
 Lead Hill Elementary School

Lead Hill High School 
Lead Hill High School serves seventh through twelfth grades.  Based on the 2009-2010 academic year, the total enrollment in the school was 185 and total full-time teachers was 19.30, with a teacher/student ratio of 9.59.

Lead Hill Elementary School 
Lead Hill Elementary School serves preschool through sixth grades.  Based on the 2009-2010 academic year, the total enrollment in the school was 213 and total full-time teachers was 23.70, with a teacher/student ratio of 8.99.

Staffing
Based on the 2009-2010 academic year, the total full-time staff of the Lead Hill School District was 88.  The total full-time teachers was 43.  The total number of non-teaching staff (including 3 administrators) was 45.

Demographics
Within the geographic area covered by the Lead Hill School District, there were 433 individuals under the age of 18, during the 2009-2010 academic year.

See also

 List of school districts in Arkansas

References

External links
 

 Boone County School District Reference Map (US Census Bureau, 2010)
 Lead Hill School District (National Center for Education Statistics)
 2010 Arkansas Legislative Audit for the Lead Hill School District

School districts in Arkansas
Education in Boone County, Arkansas